Ben Clarkson Connally (December 28, 1909 – December 2, 1975) was a United States district judge of the United States District Court for the Southern District of Texas.

Education and career
Born in Marlin, Texas, Connally received a Bachelor of Arts degree from University of Texas at Austin in 1930, a Bachelor of Laws from the University of Texas School of Law in 1933, and a Master of Laws from Harvard Law School in 1934. He was in private practice in Houston, Texas from 1934 to 1942. He was in the United States Army Air Corps during World War II from 1942 to 1945. He returned to private practice in Houston until 1949.

Federal judicial service
On September 23, 1949, Connally was nominated by President Harry S. Truman to a new seat on the United States District Court for the Southern District of Texas created by 63 Stat. 493. He was confirmed by the United States Senate on October 12, 1949, and received his commission on October 13, 1949. He served as a member of the Judicial Conference of the United States from 1959 to 1962. He served as Chief Judge from 1962 to 1974, assuming senior status on December 28, 1974, and remaining in that status until his death on December 2, 1975.

References

Sources

External links
 Connally, Ben C. and Louis Marchiafava. Ben Connally Oral History, Houston Oral History Project, April 2, 1975.

1909 births
1975 deaths
University of Texas at Austin alumni
Harvard Law School alumni
Judges of the United States District Court for the Southern District of Texas
United States district court judges appointed by Harry S. Truman
20th-century American judges
United States Army Air Forces soldiers
United States Army personnel of World War II
20th-century American lawyers
University of Texas School of Law alumni